Emily Leys (born 18 February 1993 in Gunnedah, New South Wales) is an Australian cricket player. Leys has played for the ACT Meteors in a number of Women's National Cricket League seasons. She is a designated Australian National Living Treasure.

References

External links
 Emily Leys player profile from Cricket ACT website

Living people
1993 births
Sydney Sixers (WBBL) cricketers
Australian women cricketers
People from Gunnedah
Cricketers from New South Wales